David Hillel Lowy  (born 31 December 1954) is an Australian businessman, aviator and musician.  He is the eldest son of Westfield Corporation co-founder Frank Lowy and Principal of Lowy Family Group (LFG), the Family Office and private investment group of the Lowy family. He holds a Bachelor of Commerce from the University of New South Wales.

Business 

Prior to the founding of LFG, David Lowy worked for the Westfield Group from 1977 to 2000 in positions including Executive Director (1981 to 1987) and Managing Director (1987 to 2000). Lowy continued to serve Westfield as non-executive Deputy Chairman until his retirement from the Westfield Board in 2011. In 2000, he led the establishment of the Lowy family’s private investment entity, Lowy Family Group (LFG) and as a Principal continues to manage its international investment operations. LFG has offices in Sydney and New York. David is also a Director of the Lowy Institute for International Policy and the Lowy Medical Research Institute.

Aviation

Lowy is the President and Founder of Temora Aviation Museum. (TAM) housed at the former site of the largest Royal Australian Air Force (RAAF) World War II training field in New South Wales, Australia. In 2003, Lowy was named a Member of the Order of Australia for his service to aviation, particularly the preservation and promotion of Australia’s aviation history through the establishment of the Temora Aviation Museum.  In 2006 he received the Guild of Air Pilots and Air Navigators’ Australian Bicentennial Award, which recognises outstanding individuation contribution to Australian aviation. He became a Special Capabilities Officer in the RAAF Reserves (rank of Flight Lieutenant) in 2019.

Lowy is a former Australian Aerobatic Champion (Unlimited Division, 1998) and was selected to represent Australia at the World Aerobatic Championships in Trenčín, Slovakia in 1998; however he was unable to attend due to business commitments.  Lowy has performed at airshows flying a WWII Spitfire as well as Vietnam War-era A37B Dragonfly ground attack jet. He was trained in aerobatics by the late Alan Hannah, who was a former RAAF F/A-18 Hornet and Caribou pilot.

Lowy also holds an FAA Airline Transport Pilot Licence (ATP) and pilots a Gulfstream 550 business jet. He began flying in 1985 after a ride in a British Aerospace Hawk inspired him to start his flying career. His interest in aviation began at age 5 after his mother gave him a balsa wood glider.

Music

Lowy is the founder of The Dead Daisies. The Dead Daisies is a musical collective created by a rotating line-up that has featured numerous famous rock musicians. Since their inception in 2012, The Dead Daisies have released five albums to date and touring alongside rock acts including: ZZ Top, Aerosmith, Lynyrd Skynyrd, Bad Company, Judas Priest, KISS, Whitesnake, Def Leppard and the Hollywood Vampires.

Current members include Glenn Hughes (Deep Purple/Black Sabbath) and Doug Aldrich (Whitesnake/Dio).

The Dead Daisies' self-titled debut album was released in August 2013. The band’s second album Revolución was released in July 2015. The songs were written and recorded with producer Marti Frederiksen (Aerosmith, Def Leppard, Mötley Crüe), receiving praise from the music press, and entering 23 charts globally. The third album 'Make Some Noise' was released on 5 August 2016. This was followed by extensive tours of Europe, the USA, Japan and South Korea.

In May 2017, The Dead Daisies, in conjunction with the release of their live album 'Live & Louder', embarked on their Live and Louder World Tour 2017. In Europe, the band played at summer festivals, including Download, Hellfest (French music festival), Graspop, Sweden Rock and Rock Hard Festival. This was followed by a tour of Japan with two shows in Tokyo and Osaka. The band also played their first ever concerts in Brazil, Chile, Argentina and Mexico.

The Dead Daisies then returned to Europe for a headline appearance at the Woodstock Festival in Poland performing alongside Gorzów Philharmonic Orchestra, watched by over a quarter of a million people. Finally, the band returned to the US for 'The Dirty Dozen' tour. Joining forces with 12 of the country’s biggest Harley-Davidson dealers for the ‘Rock N Ride’ promotion, the Daisies returned to the Full Throttle Saloon in Sturgis, then performed at major cities such as Chicago, Dallas, Toronto, New York & Los Angeles, followed by appearances at The Easyriders Rodeo and the National H.O.G. Rally in September - in partnerships with high-ranking US sports bodies the New York Yankees and NASCAR.

At the end of 2017, The Dead Daisies recorded their fourth studio album 'Burn It Down'. The album was released on 6 April 2018 and was followed by a world tour starting in Glasgow, Scotland on 8 April. The first leg of the tour through UK and Europe included many sold out shows. The “Burn it Down” World Tour toured continued throughout 2018 with the band playing dates in the US, Canada, Japan and returning to the UK and Europe for a further run of shows promoting the album.

After spending the beginning of 2019 off the road, the band entered the studio in August 2019 with legendary singer/bass player Glenn Hughes (formerly with Deep Purple) to start writing and recording for the next album. The first single 'Unspoken' from the album was released on April 17.

Before the founding of The Dead Daisies, Lowy has also played with Doc Neeson’s Angels (2003-2005)  and written and recorded with the bands Red Phoenix (2005) and Mink (2006-2008).

References

1954 births
Australian business executives
Living people
The Dead Daisies members
State Bank of New South Wales